Hannu-Pekka "Hoopi" Hänninen (born 27 July 1952) is a Finnish sports commentator who works for Finland's National Broadcasting Company Yle. He works both as the real-time play-by-play commentator and the sporstreader in Yle's sports news Urheiluruutu. His career as a sportscaster started in 1977. Before that he had a short spell in entertainment staff in radio. He was born in Helsinki, and trained as a telecommunications engineer.

Hänninen is known as a multi-skilled sportscaster who can commentate on almost every sport. Nowadays he usually commentates only football, ski jumping and Nordic combined. In the 1990s he also commentated very much on athletics, usually with Kari Hiltunen. Among others he commentated the Kimmo Kinnunen's World Championship winning javelin throw in 1991 Tokyo, Sari Essayah's World Championship winning 10 km walk in 1993 Stuttgart and Aki Parviainen's World Championship winning javelin throw in 1999 Sevilla. He has also commentated on every Olympic Games in television since 1984 Los Angeles. One of his main moments in Olympic games is the commentation of Matti Nykänen's gold winning jump in the 1988 Winter Olympics in Calgary. He has also been the main commentator of swimming in Yle for long time.

"Hoopi" has also been one of the main commentators in Football World Cup and European Championships since 1986 Mexico, but actually had his first football World Cup commentation almost ten years earlier in Argentina 1978, when he commentated couple of the first round matches from the studio in Pasila, Helsinki, because the main commentators Anssi Kukkonen and Pentti Salmi were unable to do so because of the number of games and traveling. The greatest moments of his football commentating careers among others are the Euro 92 final in Sweden and the 2002 FIFA World Cup final. He is the main football commentator in YLE together with Tapio Suominen.

Like many other sportcasters, Hoopi also strictly divides the people's opinions. Many people think that he is confident and decorous but he has also been the target for strong criticism because he sometimes does not seem to be very sharp and keen and does not notice what happens on the field, and also because sometimes he concentrates on things that are not the most important. His often put his soul into the events on ski jumping venue or football field passionately but same time does not forget the professional element. He had also made a splash in his workplace Yle. In 1999, when Hoopi heard that his popular colleague Antero Mertaranta had left Yle, he opened a pink sparkling wine bottle to celebrate that. There have been rumours that behind this are strong ambitions that taking root from 1995 Ice Hockey World Championships. Finland won its first and only gold medal, but Hänninen was the second-choice commentator after Mertaranta, who commentated passionately his way into the hearts of Finnish people. Mertaranta came back in 2000.

External links
 Video clip from normal hill ski jumping competition in World Championships 2007. Commentator: Hannu-Pekka Hänninen

Association football commentators
Finnish sports broadcasters
Sportspeople from Helsinki
1952 births
Living people